Anastasia Pivovarova was the defending champion, but chose not to participate.

Wang Qiang won the title after her opponent Peng Shuai retired in the final, with the score at 3–6, 7–6(7–3), 1–1.

Seeds

Draw

Finals

Top half

Bottom half

Preliminary match

 Due to the WTA mistakenly accepting too many players into the main draw, the two lowest ranked players in the draw, Jana Fett and Shiho Akita, were forced to play a preliminary match for a spot in the main draw. The winner of the match received a spot in the main draw, whereas the loser will receive one ranking point and first round prize money.

Qualifying

Seeds

Qualifiers

Qualifying draw

First qualifier

Second qualifier

Third qualifier

Fourth qualifier

References
Main Draw
Qualifying Draw

Zhengzhou Women's Tennis Open - Singles